The common name jewelflower may refer to plants in any of several genera in the mustard family, including:

Caulanthus
Streptanthus

Brassicaceae